Rick King may refer to:

 Rick King (director), American director
 Rick King (American guitarist), American guitarist featured on the Stan Ridgway album Neon Mirage
 Rick King (Canadian musician), founding member of the Canadian rock band Chimo!
 Rick King (composer), American keyboardist, composer, and conductor who performed on the Olivia Newton-John 2006 World Tour
 Rick King (producer), producer of Blood Done Sign My Name''
 Ricky King, German guitarist